Point Air was a French airline company operating a Douglas DC-8-63 on a route from Marseille and Mulhouse/Basel to Ouagadougou, Burkina Faso.

Point Air was famous for its low prices, before the age of low-cost airlines.

The airline started operations in 1980. Built on the remains of the French Antillan SATT, the Swiss-registered Point Air went into a politically enforced bankruptcy in 1988.

References

Defunct airlines of France
Airlines established in 1980
Airlines disestablished in 1988